The Miss Ecuador 1987 was held on March, 1987. There were 14 candidates for the national title, and in the end of night Verónica Sevilla crowned to María del Pílar Barreiro as Miss Ecuador 1987. The Miss Ecuador competed in Miss Universe 1987, and the 1st Runner-up competed at Miss World 1987.

Results

Placements

Special awards

Contestants

Notes

Returns

Last compete in:

1983
 Esmeraldas
 Tungurahua

Withdrawals

  Chimborazo

External links

Miss Ecuador
1987 beauty pageants
Beauty pageants in Ecuador
1987 in Ecuador